Fali may refer to:

Language
Fali languages (Cameroon), a Niger–Congo language or languages of Cameroon
Fali of Baissa, an unclassified Niger–Congo language of Nigeria
Various Chadic languages of Nigeria:
Fali of Mubi
Fali of Kirya
Fali of Mijilu
Fali of Jilbu

People
Fali people
Rafael Brieva Primo (born 1983), Spanish former footballer
Rafael Romero Serrano (born 1986), Spanish former footballer
Rafael Jiménez Jarque (born 1993), Spanish footballer
Fali Sam Nariman, Indian lawyer
Fali Homi Major, former chief of the Indian Air Force
Rohinton Fali Nariman, former judge of the Supreme Court of India
A tribal name amongst the Margi people of Borno State, Nigeria